The Disordered Mind is a Canadian medical documentary television miniseries which aired sporadically on CBC Television in 1960, 1963 and 1966.

Premise
The series concerned actual cases of mental illness, featuring the patients and practitioners involved in each case.

Scheduling

First series
Wednesdays 10:30 p.m. (Eastern), part of Explorations

 20 April 1960: "Psychosomatic Disorders: A Coronary" - an insurance agent suffers a stress-related heart attack.
 27 April 1960: "Psychoneurotic Conditions: A Pathological Anxiety" - an office employee faces anxieties which impair a regular lifestyle.
 4 May 1960: "Psychotic Conditions: A Depression" - a man afflicted with depression attempts a murder-suicide of his family.
 11 May 1960: "Anti-Social Personality Disorders: A Psychopath" - a thief who lacks conscience.

Second series
Wednesdays 10:30 p.m. (Eastern), part of Explorations

 20 February 1963: "Psychosomatic Conditions: Obesity" (1963) - the treatment of a young girl's obesity.
 27 February 1963: "The Obsessive-Compulsive Neurosis" featured a subject with obsessive–compulsive disorder who remained unemployed for five years due to this condition.
 6 March 1963: "Psychotic Conditions: Paranoid Schizophrenia" featured a person with paranoid schizophrenia who has resumed normal employment after overcoming that condition.
 20 March 1963: "The Compulsive Car Thief" featured a young adult who is serving a prison sentence for car thefts, a practice which began at age ten.

Third series
Sundays 10:30 p.m. (Eastern), stand-alone series

 11 September 1966: "Aggressive Child" - features a combative six-year-old boy.
 18 September 1966: "Girl in Danger" - concerns a 13-year-old girl who is emotionally less than half her age and deemed "pre-delinquent".
 25 September 1966: "Bright Boy, Bad Scholar" - features learning disorders and their early therapy.
 2 October 1966: "Afraid of School" - concerns a six-year-old boy who avoids school due to an incident during infancy.

References

External links
 

CBC Television original programming
1960 Canadian television series debuts
1966 Canadian television series endings
1960s Canadian documentary television series